This is a list of the members of the 2nd Seanad Éireann, the upper house of the Oireachtas (legislature) of Ireland. These Senators were elected or appointed in March 1938 and served until the close of poll for the 3rd Seanad in July 1938.

Composition of the 2nd Seanad
The Free State Seanad was elected in stages and thus considered to be in permanent session, and although there were five Seanad elections held before its abolition, is considered to have been a single Seanad for the duration of its existence and is thus referred for that whole period as the First Seanad. It was abolished by the Constitution (Amendment No. 24) Act 1936, with its last meeting on 19 May 1936. To indicate continuity with its Free State predecessor, the first Seanad elected after 1937 is numbered as the Second Seanad.

It was elected under Article 53 of the Constitution, which provided that on the coming into operation of the Constitution, which took place on 29 December 1937, a general election for the Seanad would take place as if there had been a dissolution of the Dáil.

There are a total of 60 seats in the Seanad. 43 Senators are elected by the Vocational panels, 6 elected by the Universities and 11 are nominated by the Taoiseach.

The following table shows the composition by party when the 2nd Seanad first met on 27 April 1938.

List of senators

Changes

See also
Members of the 9th Dáil
Government of the 9th Dáil

References

External links

 
02